Ženski rukometni klub Naisa (ŽRK Naisa for short) is a women's handball club from Niš, Serbia, founded in 1969. Currently, Naisa competes in the Handball League of Serbia, since 2007.

Kits

Honours 

EHF Challenge Cup:
Winners (1): 2006/07
National Championships :
 Winners (2) : 2006, 2008
 Runners-up (4) : 2007, 2009, 2016, 2022

Current squad 

Squad for the 2022–23 season

Goalkeepers
 1  Anastasija Nedeljković
 12  Katarina Kosanović
 16  Katarina Ivanović
Wingers
RW
 6  Teodora Petković
 33  Branka Stojanović
LW 
 8  Jelena Đurović
 15  Magdalena Petković
 17  Jelena Stojanović
Line Players 
 19  Sanja Stamenković
 26  Milica Mihajlović

Back players
LB
 7  Jana Milošević
 25  Masa Rajković
CB 
 11  Tamara Simonović
 14  Mina Mladenović
 20  Olivera Nikolić
CB 
 9  Jovana Veljković
 23  Nina Milovanović

European record

Notable former players 
 Sanja Damnjanović
 Biljana Filipović
 Jelena Popović
 Svetlana Ognjenović
 Sanja Premović

Notable former coaches 
 Svetislav Jovanović

See also 
 RK Naissus

External links
Official website : http://www.zrknaisa.org.rs/index-e.html

Serbian handball clubs
Sport in Niš